Sir Henry Francis Herbert Thompson, 2nd Baronet (2 April 1859 – 26 May 1944) was a British Egyptologist.

Henry Thompson was born in London on 2 April 1859, the son of Sir Henry Thompson, 1st Baronet and Kate Fanny Loder, the English composer and pianist. He was educated at Marlborough College and Trinity College, Cambridge. After careers in medicine and law (he was admitted to the Inner Temple in 1878 and called to the bar in 1882), he became interested in Egyptology.  He was a lecturer and fellow at University College London, and chairman of the Golders Green Crematorium.  There is a chair established in his name at Cambridge University; the Sir Herbert Thompson Professor of Egyptology.

He died on 26 May 1944 in Bath.

See also
List of Egyptologists

References

External links
 Profile at Cambridge University

1859 births
1944 deaths
British Egyptologists
Thompson, Henry, 2nd Baronet
Alumni of Trinity College, Cambridge
People educated at Marlborough College
Academics of University College London
Members of the Inner Temple